The Novato meteorite is an ordinary chondrite which entered the earth's atmosphere and broke up over Northern California at 19:44 Pacific Time on 17 October 2012. The falling bolide created a bright fireball and sonic booms and fragmented into smaller pieces as the intense friction of passing through the atmosphere heated it and absorbed its kinetic energy.

Meteorite
The first fragment of the meteorite (N01) was recovered by Lisa Webber on 20 October after reading a story in the San Francisco Chronicle that described the NASA/CAMS meteor trajectory predicting a fall area in the North Bay. Lisa recalled hearing a sound on her roof the night of the meteor and went outside and located a 62 gram stone. Analysis of fragment N01 by Dr. Alan Rubin came back as a L6 breccia.

The second fragment was found by Brien Cook on 22 October (66 grams) and the third fragment was found by Jason Utas on 27 October (79 grams). The largest fragment recovered as of 5 November 2012 is N04 at 96 grams found by Robert Verish on 27 October. A fifth stone (N05) weighing 24 grams was found by Jason Utas on November 2. A sixth stone (N06) weighing 23.7 grams was found by the Kane family on November 11.  More massive  fragments may have fallen near Sonoma with any  fragments possibly falling near Yountville.

This was the second significant meteorite in California in 2012, the first being the Sutter's Mill meteorite.

See also

 Glossary of meteoritics

References

External links 
 Bay Area Fireball, Oct. 17, 2012 (Animation of Robert P. Moreno Jr images)
 Bob Moreno images of meteor just outside Santa Rosa (ABC 17 Oct 2012)
 CAMS News blog (CAMS is an automated video surveillance of the night sky in search of meteors to validate minor showers in the IAU Working List of Meteor Showers)
 Meteorite Hunt (Jason Utas)
 Findings from the Strewn-field (Bob Verish)

Meteorites found in the United States
Modern Earth impact events
2012 in California
2012 in space
Marin County, California
Geology of California
October 2012 events in the United States